An election to Essex County Council took place on 7 June 2001 as part of the 2001 United Kingdom local elections. 79 councillors were elected from various electoral divisions, which returned either one or two county councillors each by first-past-the-post voting for a four-year term of office. The electoral divisions were the same as those used at the previous election in 1997.

The Conservative Party retained control of Essex County Council in the 2001 local elections, with an increased majority.

Summary
Going in to the election the Conservatives had run the Council in a minority government since 2000.

Previous composition

1997 election

Composition of council seats before election

Results

|-bgcolor=#F6F6F6
| colspan=2 style="text-align: right; margin-right: 1em" | Total
| style="text-align: right;" | 79
| colspan=5 |
| style="text-align: right;" | 618,785
| style="text-align: right;" | 
|-
|}

Election of Group Leaders

Paul White (Stock) was re elected leader of the Conservative Group, Paul Sztumpf (Harlow North) was elected leader of the Labour Group and Kenneth Jones (Park) was re elected leader of the Liberal Democratic Group.

Election of Leader of the Council

Paul White the leader of the conservative group was duly elected leader of the council and formed a conservative administration.

Results by Electoral Divisions

Basildon

District summary

Division results

Between 1997 and 2001, the seat was won by Labour in a by-election, however it is shown as a Conservative hold as it is compared to the previous full council election.

Braintree

District summary

Division results

Brentwood

District summary

Division results

Castle Point

District summary

Division results

Chelmsford

District summary

Division results

Colchester

District summary

Division results

No Independent candidate as previous (−24.3).

Epping Forest

District summary

Division results

Harlow

District summary

Division results

Maldon

District summary

Division results

Rochford

District summary

Division results

Tendring

District summary

Division results

Uttlesford

District summary

Division results

References

Essex County Council elections
2001 English local elections
2000s in Essex
June 2001 events in the United Kingdom